The Fiddler's Reach Fog Signal is a fog signal station located on the Kennebec River in Arrowsic, Maine, in Sagadahoc County. The pyramidal bell structure was built in 1914, two years after a large steamship, the Ransom B. Fuller, ran aground in the fog on this section of the river.

History
The signal was rung to assist ships navigating the treacherous S-bend section of the river known as Fiddler Reach. It was a bell from 1914 until the late sixties and then a horn until it was discontinued in 1982.  The signal, while not part of the Kennebec River Light Station, was tended by its station keeper.  He reached it along a footpath that included a boardwalk and two wooden bridges.  While it was a bell, it was rung by means of a clockwork counter weight system that had to be rewound every 4 hours.  Bell signals were distinguished by the number of strokes and length of time between them.  This signal was two strokes every twenty seconds.

The structure eventually fell into disrepair.  The original bell was removed by the Coast Guard in 1972 and is now displayed on the campus of the Coast Guard Academy in New London, Connecticut.

It was restored by volunteer effort of the "Range Light Keepers", a self-described "group of interested local Maine citizens and visitors".

A replacement bell has been obtained and kept at the Arrowsic Town Hall.Until 2016 when the bell was installed on the tower's  exterior bell arm

The property was added to the National Register of Historic Places (NRHP) on August 5, 2009 and the listing was announced as the featured listing in the National Park Service's weekly list of August 14, 2009.

See also
Fort Point Light Station, a Maine lighthouse station also having a pyramidal fog bell structure
Perkins Island Light, four miles (6 km) downriver, also with a pyramidal fog bell structure
Tenants Harbor Light, with a square pyramidal bell reconstructed by Jamie Wyeth.
National Register of Historic Places listings in Sagadahoc County, Maine

Gallery

References

External links

restoration webpage, The Range Light Keepers, Arrowsic Island, Maine

Buildings and structures on the National Register of Historic Places in Maine
Towers completed in 1914
Transport infrastructure completed in 1914
Transportation buildings and structures in Sagadahoc County, Maine
Kennebec River
Navigational aids
National Register of Historic Places in Sagadahoc County, Maine